The 1976–77 Hong Kong First Division League season was the 66th since its establishment.

League table

References
1976–77 Hong Kong First Division table (RSSSF)

Hong
Hong Kong First Division League seasons
football